Grüner Heiner is a mountain of Baden-Württemberg, Germany. It is a Schuttberg, an artificial hill built from the ruins and rubble from World War II.

Mountains and hills of Baden-Württemberg
Artificial hills